Occlusion may refer to:

Health and fitness
 Occlusion (dentistry), the manner in which the upper and lower teeth come together when the mouth is closed
  Occlusion miliaria, a skin condition
  Occlusive dressing, an air- and water-tight trauma dressing used in first aid
 Vascular occlusion, blockage of a blood vessel
 Vascular occlusion training, or blood flow restriction training, a technique done by some bodybuilders

Other uses
 Ambient occlusion, a shading method used in 3D computer graphics
 Occluded front, part of cyclone formation
 Occlusion culling, or hidden surface determination, a 3D computer graphics process
 Occlusion effect, an audio phenomenon
 Occlusive, in phonetics

See also 
 Occlusion training (disambiguation)
 Occultation, when one object is hidden by another object that passes between it and the observer